Clinidium spatulatum is a species of ground beetle in the subfamily Rhysodinae. It was described by R.T. Bell & J.R. Bell in 1985. Its type locality is Santa Rita Ridge in Colón Province, Panama. Primarily a Panamanian species, its range extends to Osa Peninsula in southeastern Costa Rica. There is also a female collected from Gorgona Island (Colombia), which could well be a distinct species endemic to that island, but which has tentatively been assigned to this species, awaiting better material.

References

Clinidium
Beetles of Central America
Fauna of Costa Rica
Fauna of Panama
Beetles described in 1985